The comprehensive discography of Praga Khan, a Belgium-based new beat artist, consists of eight studio albums, two live albums, three compilation albums, two remix albums two soundtrack albums, thirty-three singles, one sampler, and one video album.

This list does not include material by Praga Khan supremo Maurice Engelen, that was recorded with 101, 2 Body's, Alpha Beta, Angel Ice, Anthony Prince, Baba Yaga, Babe Instinct, Boy Toy, Channel X, Code Red, The Damage Twins, Digital Orgasm, Dirty Harry, DNM, E-Angel, Electric Shock, The Executive Board, Forza, Groove Reactor, Heaven is Venus, Heavenly Bodies, The Immortals, JK Magick, Kaotix, Lina, Lords of Acid, M.N.O., Major Problem, Moments of Ecstasy, Mr. & Mrs. Freak, Musical Reporters, Nasty Thoughts, Overnight Sensations, Phantasia, Quinine, Rhythm Kings, Save Sex, Science Lab, Shakti, Subtrance, Tattoo of Pain, Time Zone, Tribe 22, Wild Girls, or Zsa Zsa Deluxe.



Studio albums

Live albums

Remix albums

Video albums

Compilation albums

Soundtracks

Samplers

Singles

See also
Maurice Engelen discography

References

External links
 
 

Discographies of Belgian artists